Tsing Yi Promenade is a promenade along the northeastern seafront of Tsing Yi Island, Hong Kong. It was built in stages from 2001 to 2004.

The Promenade faces Rambler Channel, from Greenfield Garden, through Tsing Yi Pier and Maritime Square to Cheung Fat Estate. At the end of this promenade is the Tsing Yi Northeast Park. The promenade spans  and occupies  along the waterfront. Many people use this as a recreational area for jogging, exercising, and practising T'ai chi. There is a marvellous sea view for people to enjoy at night.

Gallery

See also
 List of urban public parks and gardens in Hong Kong
 Tsing Yi Swimming Pool

References

Urban public parks and gardens in Hong Kong
Tsing Yi